The following highways are numbered 89A:

United States
 U.S. Route 89A
 Arizona State Route 89A
 Illinois Route 89A (former)
 New York State Route 89A (former)